Mirror Mirror is a 2012 American fantasy comedy film based on the fairy tale "Snow White" collected by the Brothers Grimm.

It is directed by Tarsem Singh and produced by Ryan Kavanaugh, Bernie Goldmann, Brett Ratner and Kevin Misher. It was written by Marc Klein and Jason Keller, with music by Alan Menken. It stars Lily Collins, Julia Roberts, Armie Hammer, Nathan Lane, Mare Winningham, Michael Lerner, and Sean Bean. It was released theatrically by Relativity Media on March 30, 2012.

The film received an Academy Award nomination for Best Costume Design and earned $183 million on an $85–100 million budget but received generally mixed reviews from critics. Mirror Mirror was released on DVD and Blu-ray by 20th Century Fox Home Entertainment on June 26, 2012.

Plot
A widowed king marries an evil enchantress named Clementianna, who is the most beautiful woman in the land. One day, the king leaves to fight a great evil that has invaded the land, but never returns. Clementianna becomes Queen and rules in his absence, while confining her young stepdaughter, Snow White, to the palace.

Ten years later, Snow White, now a young lady, desires to explore the kingdom and sneaks out. Walking through the forest, she meets the visiting Prince Andrew Alcott, a prince from the Kingdom of Valencia, who has been robbed by a band of Dwarves; she and the prince are instantly smitten with each other. Snow White arrives in the town, and finds the people are destitute due to the Queen's heavy taxation.

Meanwhile, Clementianna is introduced to Alcott and plans to marry him for his wealth. Clementianna throws a ball to woo the Prince, and Snow White secretly attends, planning to ask the prince to help her restore the kingdom. Clementianna notices Snow White and the prince dancing and orders her manservant Brighton to take the princess into the forest and feed her to the beast. Brighton leaves Snow White in the forest, but she runs away from the beast, collapsing at the door to the dwarves' hideout.  The dwarves take her in and introduce themselves as Grimm, Butcher, Wolf, Napoleon, Half Pint, Grub, and Chuck. When Brighton collects more taxes levied by the queen to pay for her expensive parties, the dwarves rob him. Snow White takes the money and returns it to the townspeople, crediting the dwarves, whom the people hail as heroes.

Clementianna informs Alcott that Snow White is dead. When the prince finds out that the bandits have robbed Brighton, he goes after them. In the forest, Alcott discovers that Snow White is alive and in league with the dwarves, who have trained her in combat. Each believing the other to be in the wrong, Snow White and Alcott duel. Alcott returns to the palace defeated and informs the queen that Snow White is alive.

Clementianna enters her Mirror House, within which lives her reflection, the Mirror Queen. Clementianna has the Mirror Queen temporarily turn Brighton into a cockroach, and requests a love potion so she can make the prince fall in love with her. The potion turns out to be a 'puppy love' potion and the prince becomes devoted to her like a puppy dog. Under this spell, the prince agrees to marry her. Using dark magic, the queen attacks Snow White and the dwarves with two giant marionettes; but Snow White defeats them by finding and cutting their strings.

On the day of her wedding, Clementianna arrives to find that Snow White and the dwarves have robbed the party and abducted the Prince; for her inability to handle bandits and for lying about Snow White's death, the aristocrats demand the queen be deposed. Back in the forest, Snow White manages to break the spell on Alcott with true love's kiss.

Snow White encounters Clementianna, who sends the beast after her. Prince Alcott tries to save Snow White, but the Beast captures her. However, the beast hesitates in killing her and Snow White sees that it wears a necklace with a moon charm on it similar to the one the queen wears. Snow White cuts the necklace off, breaking Clementianna’s spell, and restoring the beast to its true form: Snow White’s father. Clementianna begins to age rapidly and the Mirror Queen explains this is her punishment for using dark magic.

Grateful to Alcott for his assistance, the king agrees to let him marry Snow White. At the wedding, an old hag appears and offers Snow White an apple as a wedding gift. At first, Snow White accepts the apple; but, as she is about to bite it, she realizes that the old hag is Clementianna. Snow White cuts a piece from the apple with her father's dagger and gives it to Clementianna, who reluctantly accepts it. The Mirror House shatters declaring it Snow White's story after all. Snow White, Prince Alcott, the King and the dwarves live happily ever after.

Cast
 Lily Collins as Princess Snow White
 Julia Roberts as Queen Clementianna, Snow White's evil stepmother.
 Armie Hammer as Prince Andrew Alcott, the Prince of Valencia.
 Nathan Lane as Brighton, the Queen's executive bootlicker.
 Mare Winningham as Margaret, the royal baker who was Snow White's friend since childhood.
 Michael Lerner as the Baron, an elite member of the kingdom who is often recommended for Queen Clementianna to get engaged to.
 Sean Bean as the King, the father of Snow White, who went missing.
 Danny Woodburn as Will Grimm, the leader of the Seven Dwarfs. He is named after the Brothers Grimm.
 Martin Klebba as Butcher, a dwarf who used to work as a butcher.
 Sebastian Saraceno as Wolf, a dwarf in a wolf-skin cape.
 Jordan Prentice as Napoleon, a dwarf who wears a hat similar to Napoleon's.
 Mark Povinelli as Half Pint, a dwarf who has a crush on Snow White.
 Joe Gnoffo as Grub, a dwarf who is always eating.
 Ronald Lee Clark as Chuckles, a dwarf who chuckles a lot.
 Lisa Roberts Gillan as Mirror Queen, the reflection of Queen Clementianna who is much wiser, kinder, and somewhat younger than her. 
 Gillan's image is replaced with the digital likeness of Julia Roberts who voices the mirror.
 Robert Emms as Charles Renbock, Prince Alcott's faithful valet and confidant.
 Alex Ivanovici as Town Magistrate, the magistrate of the town that collects the taxes for Brighton.
 Frank Welker as the voice of the Beast, a chimeric creature with a lion/dog-like head, the antlers of a deer, chicken leg-like arms, the wings of an eagle, and the body and tail of a snake with a tail-claw at the end of the tail.
 Welker also provides the vocal effects of the giant puppets.

Production

Development
Roberts was the first to be cast, because very early on Tarsem Singh wanted an Evil Queen with whom audiences could relate. He stated that in the film, the queen is not evil, but rather insecure. He also suggested that the Queen's true ugliness may be revealed at the very end of the film. Originally Saoirse Ronan was considered for the role of Snow White but the age difference between her and Armie Hammer was too large (he was 25 and she was 17). Felicity Jones was offered the part but turned it down. Collins was eventually cast in the role. Collins said in an interview that her casting happened in 24 hours after she met Tarsem Singh and read for him. Hammer was cast as the prince who is at first drawn towards the Queen and then towards Snow White. He beat out James McAvoy and Alex Pettyfer for the role.

Filming
Filming for Mirror Mirror began on June 20, 2011, in Montreal, Quebec, under the working title Untitled Snow White Project. Production on the film wrapped in mid-September. The film was officially titled Mirror Mirror on November 4, 2011. The first trailer was released on November 30, 2011, in partnership with Relativity Media and Trailer Park. The teaser poster was released the same day. Mirror Mirror was the last film which Tarsem's regular costume designer, Eiko Ishioka, worked on before her death. The visual effects were designed by Tom Wood and executed by Wayne Brinton, Tim Carras, Sébastien Moreau and Amanda Dyar. Relativity Media announced the movie's final cost as being $85 million, though an article in the Los Angeles Times said the true budget was closer to $100 million.

Release
The film was released in theaters on March 30, 2012.

Reception

The film received generally mixed reviews. Review aggregator Rotten Tomatoes gives the film a rating of 50% with an average score of 5.60/10 based on reviews from 197 critics. The site's general consensus is that "Like most of Tarsem Singh's films, Mirror Mirror is undeniably beautiful – but its treatment of the age-old Snow White fable lacks enough depth or originality to set it apart from the countless other adaptations of the tale." On Metacritic, which assigns a weighted mean rating out of 100 reviews from film critics, it has an average score of 46 from the 34 reviews, which indicates "Mixed or average reviews".

Robbie Collin from British newspaper The Telegraph gave the film four stars describing it as "an exuberantly charming fairy story that owes as much to the gnarled folk tale illustrations of Arthur Rackham as the stagey, saturated lunacy of that half-loved, half-feared East German fantasy The Singing Ringing Tree. It's a Grimm piece of work, but far from a grim one: without rehashing the seminal Disney animated version, it radiates gorgeousness and good humour with a near-nuclear intensity." Collin praised costume designer Eiko Ishioka's work, saying "every outfit in Mirror Mirror is a masterpiece". He concluded the film is "the opposite of Tim Burton's brash, chaotic, dispiritingly popular Alice in Wonderland: here, the artistry of the cast and crew leaps off the screen, not 3D computer graphics."

Box office
On its opening day, Mirror Mirror made $5.8 million, coming in at the No. 3 spot behind The Hunger Games and Wrath of the Titans. For its opening weekend, the film earned $18.1 million while holding onto the No. 3 spot at the box office. During its theatrical run, Mirror Mirror grossed $64.9 million in North America and $118.1 million internationally, bringing its worldwide total to $183 million.

Home media
Mirror Mirror was released on DVD and Blu-ray by 20th Century Fox Home Entertainment on June 26, 2012.

Awards and nominations

Soundtrack
The song "I Believe in Love" was originally written in 1970 by Nina Hart, a singer-song writer and stage and TV actress (then working at New York City music-publishing company, Golden Bough Productions.) The song was one of several written by Hart for director Miloš Forman to consider for his film Taking Off. She performed the song in Forman's film, playing a character at an audition; Hart's recording was a hit in Italy and was later covered by Iranian singer Googoosh. Tarsem Singh—who was unaware that it had previously been used in a film—chose the song for the Bollywood-style musical finale of Mirror Mirror because his daughter had enjoyed the song when he had played it for her the previous year.

 I Believe In Love (Mirror Mirror Mix) – Performed by Lily Collins
 All Music – Written and composed by Alan Menken

See also

 Snow White and the Huntsman, another 2012 film based on the tale of Snow White.
 Snow White, an upcoming film based on the 1937 animated film, starring Rachel Zegler as Snow White and Gal Gadot as the Evil Queen.

References

External links
 
 
 
 
 Opening Sequence Animation

2012 films
2012 fantasy films
2012 romantic comedy films
2010s adventure comedy films
2010s fantasy comedy films
American adventure comedy films
American fantasy adventure films
American fantasy comedy films
American romantic comedy films
American children's comedy films
American children's fantasy films
Films about dwarfs
Films about royalty
Films about witchcraft
Films based on Snow White
Films directed by Tarsem Singh
Films scored by Alan Menken
Films shot in Montreal
Films using motion capture
Relativity Media films
2010s English-language films
2010s American films